The Marxist–Leninist Committee (usually referred to as ML Committee, in ) is a small political party in the Indian state of Andhra Pradesh, led by K. Venkateswar Rao. The activities of the group are limited to a few districts in the eastern part of the state, for example Guntur. Ahead of the 2004 Lok Sabha elections the ML Committee was part of the front launched by Communist Party of India (Marxist-Leninist) Red Flag and Communist Party of India (Marxist-Leninist).

Political parties in Andhra Pradesh
Communist parties in India
Political parties with year of establishment missing